Evan Handler (born January 10, 1961) is an American actor who is best known for playing Harry Goldenblatt, a divorce attorney and later husband of Charlotte York on Sex and the City (2002–2004) and its revival series And Just Like That… (2021–present), and Charlie Runkle, Hank Moody's comically bumbling friend and agent, on Californication (2007–2014). Recently, he starred as Eastern District US Attorney Jacob Warner in the Starz drama Power.

Early life
Handler was born in New York City, to secular Jewish parents Enid Irene, a mental health administrator, and Murry Raymond Handler, an agency owner and advertising designer. He was raised in the Town of Cortlandt, New York, near Croton-on-Hudson, New York, and attended Hendrick Hudson High School in Montrose, New York.

After graduating from high school a year early, he moved to New York City and worked as an intern at the Chelsea Theater Center. During that time he appeared in the Off-Broadway plays Biography: A Game and Strider: The Story of a Horse. He then attended the Juilliard School as a member of the Drama Division's Group 12 (1979–1983), which also included Kevin Spacey, Ving Rhames, and Elizabeth McGovern. Handler left the four-year program after less than two years to accept a role in the 1981 film Taps.

Career

Acting
Handler has appeared in television dramas and sitcoms including Six Feet Under, Friends, Law & Order, The West Wing, Miami Vice, Sex and the City, Studio 60 on the Sunset Strip (as co-executive producer Ricky Tahoe), Ed, Lost,  24 and Power. He was a co-star in the ABC sitcoms It's Like, You Know... and Hot Properties and starred in the ill-fated FOX sitcom Woops!.

He has also appeared in several major feature film roles, including Ransom, 1996; The Chosen, 1981; Sweet Lorraine, 1987; and Taps, 1981.

In 2000, Handler portrayed Larry Fine in the made-for-TV biopic The Three Stooges. He played Goldman Sachs CEO Lloyd Blankfein in the HBO movie, Too Big to Fail. The movie was based on the book of the same name written by Andrew Ross Sorkin. From 2007-2014, Handler played Charlie Runkle, the best friend and agent to David Duchovny's character Hank Moody on Californication. In 2016 he had a recurring role in American Crime Story: The People v. O. J. Simpson as Alan Dershowitz, an attorney adviser for the defense in the O. J. Simpson murder case in 1995.

In 1991, Handler famously walked off stage during the first act of a performance of the Broadway play I Hate Hamlet after co-star Nicol Williamson broke choreography during a sword-fighting scene and struck Handler on the backside. Handler responded later, "I removed myself from the production because from the first day of rehearsals I have endured the show's producers condoning Nicol Williamson's persistent abusiveness to other cast members." Handler's understudy continued the performance, for which Gregory Peck and Elaine Stritch were in attendance.

In 2020, Handler appeared as a guest on the Studio 60 on the Sunset Strip marathon fundraiser episode of The George Lucas Talk Show.

Writing
Handler is also an author. His first book, Time On Fire: My Comedy of Terrors, tells the story of his unlikely recovery from acute myeloid leukemia in his mid-20s. His second, It's Only Temporary...The Good News and the Bad News of Being Alive, tells the story of his long journey toward gratitude in the years after his illness. The book was released in May 2008. Handler has written for several nationally distributed magazines, including ELLE, O, the Oprah Magazine, and Mirabella. Handler contributes regularly to The Huffington Post.

Personal life
Evan married Elisa Atti, an Italian-born chemist, in 2003, and they have a daughter, Sofia Clementina Handler (born January 17, 2007).

Handler has a brother Lowell and a sister Lillian.  Lowell Handler, a writer and photographer, is the author of the book Twitch & Shout: A Touretter's Tale and the star, narrator, and associate producer of the Emmy-nominated PBS television documentary Twitch & Shout, in which Evan appeared.

Activism 
In 2014 Handler starred in a public service announcement supporting DC Statehood. He attended the Creative Coalition's "DC Statehood Dinner" in December 2015 and participates in DC Shadow Senator Paul Strauss’ “51 Stars" campaign which aims to enlist 51 celebrities to endorse making Washington, DC the 51st state.

Filmography

Film

Television

References

External links
 
 
 Evan Handler talks about being crass on Sex and the City, being Jewish, and his bout with leukemia
 Evan Handler: Living Through It

1961 births
Male actors from New York City
American male film actors
American male television actors
Jewish American male actors
Juilliard School alumni
Living people
People from Cortlandt, New York
20th-century American male actors
21st-century American male actors
21st-century American Jews